The Whittenton Mills Complex is a historic textile mill site located on Whittenton Street in Taunton, Massachusetts, on the banks of the Mill River. The site has been used for industrial purposes since 1670, when James Leonard built an iron forge on the west bank of the river. The first textile mill was built in 1805 and expanded throughout the 19th century. The complex was added to the National Register of Historic Places in 1984, and now contains various small businesses.

In October 2005, the site gained national attention when the mill's 1832 wooden dam threatened to collapse after heavy rains. More than 2,000 people were evacuated for several days while officials and work crews could shore up the dam with boulders. As of 2012, there is an effort underway to have the dam removed entirely, and allow for restoration of the river bed.

In 2008, scenes from the Martin Scorsese film Shutter Island, portraying the Dachau concentration camp were filmed here.

History
Between 1670 and 1805, the Leonard family operated a forge on the west bank of the Mill River, at was originally called Whittington. In 1805, Crocker, Bush and Richmond established a nail mill on the site. In 1807, a second story was added to the mill for the manufacture of cotton yarn. This mill was destroyed by fire on November 9, 1811, but soon rebuilt at 70 feet long by 30 feet wide, with three stories. Thomas Bush retired from the firm in 1812, which was renamed Crocker and Richmond. The first power looms were introduced in 1818.

In early 1823, Samuel Crocker and Charles Richmond organized the Taunton Manufacturing Company, along with several wealthy Boston investors. The new company operated a variety of businesses, including the manufacture of copper, iron, machinery, cotton and woolen textiles, at several sites throughout Taunton. In 1824, a new mill was built at Whittenton, on the east bank of the river, under the management of James K. Mills & Company of Boston.

A second mill was added in 1831-32. Constructed in stone, the mill contained seventy looms for the manufacture of fine cotton goods. James K. Mills & Company assumed full ownership of the property in 1835. A year later, Willard Lovering joined the new venture, and made improvements to the manufacturing facilities. The original 1811 mill was destroyed by fire in January, 1839. A new mill was soon erected, and the 1832 mill was enlarged in 1840. Lovering and his sons purchased the property after the financial Panic of 1857 in which James K. Mills & Company was ruined.

Lovering retired in 1864 and turned control of the mills over to his three sons, Charles L., William Croad, and Henry Morton Lovering. By 1883, when the company was incorporated as the Whittenton Manufacturing Company, the factory covered a site of about 15 acres, and contained over 400,000 square feet of manufacturing space, producing a variety of cotton goods, including ginghams, dress goods, fancy tickings, shirtings, flannels, and denims. The facility was powered by five Corliss engines with a total of 1,200 horsepower, and water wheels providing an additional 250 horsepower.

In 1881, the Old Colony Railroad opened a connection to the Whittenton Mills from Whittenton Junction. The following year, the line was extended to the mainline at Raynham. A weaving shop was added to the mills in 1884.

By 1917, the Whittenton Manufacturing Company was capitalized at $600,000, with Arthur Lyman as president. It contained 45,040 spindles and 1,640 looms, and produced ginghams and blankets.

Recent history
Several scenes from the movie Shutter Island were filmed here in February and March 2008. A cast of hundreds was needed to shoot the scenes, which portrayed a Nazi concentration camp.

A flea market was established on the site in 2009. It operated until January, 2012. On January 31, 2012, current owner David Murphy of Jefferson Development Partners announced plans for a Chinese firm to invest $25 Million into the complex, as part of a proposed project to convert the 42-acre site into residences and businesses.

See also
Cohannet Mill No. 3
National Register of Historic Places listings in Taunton, Massachusetts
Old Colony Iron Works-Nemasket Mills Complex
Reed and Barton Complex

References

National Register of Historic Places in Taunton, Massachusetts
History of Bristol County, Massachusetts
Industrial buildings and structures on the National Register of Historic Places in Massachusetts
Buildings and structures in Taunton, Massachusetts
1805 establishments in Massachusetts